Type 77, military designation Type 77-2, is a tracked tractor developed in the 1970s to tow artillery guns and used by the PLA. The vehicle is based on Type 77 armored personnel carrier.

References

External links
 Type 77

Tracked military vehicles
Military vehicles of the People's Republic of China
Artillery tractors